Xunhua Salar Autonomous County is a Salar autonomous county in the southeast of Haidong Prefecture of Qinghai Province, China, and the only autonomous Salar county in China.

Xunhua Salar Autonomous County is the only solely Salar autonomous county in China, and the Salar language is the official language in Xunhua, as in all Salar autonomous areas.

As of April 2009, Xunhua is also the site of a mosque containing the oldest hand-written copy of the Quran in China, believed to have been written sometime between the 8th and 13th centuries.

History
Xunhua County is the location of the Bronze Age necropolis Suzhi of the Kayue culture.

Salar arrival 
Ethnic Salars first arrived in present-day Xunhua Salar Autonomous County during the 13th or 14th century, as part of the Mongol army. Initially, Salar settlers cohabitated with ethnic Tibetans, moving into existing Tibetan villages along the Yellow River. However, as a result of population pressures and religious differences, conflicts between the two groups broke out, and Salar populations expelled local Tibetans, first from villages along the south of the Yellow River, and later, from villages along the northern bank.

Post Salar migration and settlement
After the Oghuz Turkmen Salars moved from Samarkand in Central Asia to Xunhua, Qinghai in the early Ming dynasty, they converted Tibetan women to Islam and the Tibetan women were taken as wives by Salar men. A Salar wedding ritual where grains and milk were scattered on a horse by the bride was influenced by Tibetans. After they moved into northern Tibet, the Salars originally practiced the same Gedimu (Gedem) variant of Sunni Islam as the Hui people and adopted Hui practices like using the Hui Jingtang Jiaoyu Islamic education during the Ming dynasty which derived from Yuan dynasty Arabic and Persian primers. One of the Salar primers was called "Book of Diverse Studies" in Chinese. The version of Sunni Islam practiced by Salars was greatly impacted by Salars marrying with Hui who had settled in Xunhua. The Hui introduced new Naqshbandi Sufi orders like Jahriyya and Khufiyya to the Salars and eventually these Sufi orders led to sectarian violence involving Qing soldiers (Han, Tibetans and Mongols) and the Sufis which included the Chinese Muslims (Salars and Hui). Hui sufi master Ma Laichi brought the Khufiyya Naqshbandi order to the Salars and the Salars followed the Flowered mosque order of the Khafiyya. Ma preached silent dhikr and simplified Qur'an readings bringing the Arabic text Mingsha jing to China.

The Kargan Tibetans, who live next to the Salar, have mostly become Muslim due to the Salars. The Salar oral tradition recalls that it was around 1370 in which they came from Samarkand to China.

The Ming dynasty established control of the area by the year 1370, placing it under the jurisdiction of Hezhou, located in Gansu. Following this conquest, Hui settlers from Hezhou began moving to the region, and began trading with and marrying local Salars. Many Salars originally surnamed "Han", which acted as a derivative of term "khan" adopted the surname "Ma", which acted as a derivative of "Muhammed". Marriage ceremonies, funerals, birth rites and prayer were shared by both Salar and Hui as they intermarried. These increasing economic and cultural ties between Salars and the Hui resulted in intermarriages between the two groups becoming commonplace, even more so than marriages between local Salars and Tibetans, or between Salars and Mongols and Han Chinese.

The Salar language, culture, and sociopolitical organization were all highly impacted throughout the 14th–16th centuries by large-scale interethnic contact and interethnic marriage. For example, Salars adopted high-walled adobe compounds and side-buttoning coats from Tibetic and Mongolic influences. The Salar language imported semantic and grammatical lexemes from Mongolic languages, and upon the end of Mongol rule in the late 14th century, many Salars were fleunt in Tibetan and Chinese languages as a result of increasing contact with these two groups.

Since the early Ming dynasty, many Salars in the region engaged in long-distance traded along the Yellow River, a practice which has continued into modern times. Much of the region's trade had historically utilized the river to reach destinations such as Lanzhou and Ningxia.

Salars were bilingual in Salar and Tibetan due to intermarriage with Tibetan women and trading. It is far less likely for a Tibetan to speak Salar. Tibetan women in Xiahe also married Muslim men who came there as traders before the 1930s.

In eastern Qinghai and Gansu there were cases of Tibetan women who stayed in their Buddhist Lamaist religion while marrying Chinese Muslim men and they would have different sons who would be Buddhist and Muslims, the Buddhist sons became Lamas while the other sons were Muslims. Hui and Tibetans married Salars.

The later Qing dynasty and Republic of China Salar General Han Youwen was born to a Tibetan woman named Ziliha and a Salar father named Aema.

In 1917, the Hui Muslim General Ma Anliang ordered his younger brother Ma Guoliang to suppress a rebellion of Tibetans in Xunhua who rebelled because of taxes Ma Anliang imposed on them. Ma Anliang did not report it to the central government in Beijing and was reprimanded for it and the Hui Muslim General Ma Qi was sent by the government to investigate the case and suppress the rebellion.

Choekyi Gyaltsen, the 10th Panchen Lama, was born in Xunhua Salar Autonomous County on February 19, 1938.

In April 1958, during the Great Leap Forward, an uprising of ethnic Tibetan and Salar people against the government took place, known as the Xunhua Incident. Over 400 people were killed by the People's Liberation Army as a result.

In 1996, Wimdo township only had one Salar because Tibetans complained about the Muslim call to prayer and a mosque built in the area in the early 1990s so they kicked out most of the Salars from the region.

Geography 
Xunhua Salar Autonomous County is located in the east of Qinghai province, under the jurisdiction of the prefecture-level city of Haidong.

Climate

Administrative divisions 
Xunhua Salar Autonomous County administers three towns, two townships, and four ethnic townships.

The autonomous four ethnic townships are Daowei Tibetan Ethnic Township, Gangcha Tibetan Ethnic Township, Wendu Tibetan Ethnic Township, and Galeng Tibetan Ethnic Township.

Demographics 
Xunhua Salar Autonomous County is a majority-minority region within China, with the eponymous Salar people constituting 62.7% of the autonomous county's population, per a 2022 government publication. Other sizeable ethnic minority populations within the autonomous county include Tibetans and the Hui. Conversely, the Han Chinese make up just 6.5% of the autonomous county's population.

Salar subgroups 
Salars in the area live along both banks of the Yellow River, south and north. Due to a prolonged period of separation due to a lack of bridge across the river, separate subgroups of Salars in the areas emerged: Bayan Salars, largely concentrated in present-day Hualong Hui Autonomous County to the north, and Xunhua Salars who largely reside in Xunhua Salar Autonomous County. This physical separation has resulted linguistic and cultural differences between Xunhua Salars and Bayan Salars to the north, to such a degree that government officials from the Qing dynasty identified them as two distinct groups. The region north of the Yellow River is a mix of discontinuous Salar and Tibetan villages while the region south of the yellow river is solidly Salar with no gaps in between, since Hui and Salars pushed the Tibetans on the south region out earlier.

Economy 
In 2021, Xunhua Salar Autonomous County's gross domestic product (GDP) totaled 4.036 billion renminbi (RMB), an increase of 6.5% over the previous year. Total retail sales in the autonomous county totaled 1.19 billion RMB, an increase of 7.5% from the previous year.

As of 2021, the per capita disposable income of urban residents reached 35,233 RMB, an increase of 6.8% from the previous year; per capita disposable income of rural residents totaled 13,773 RMB, an increase of 10.6% from the previous year.

The autonomous county has a sizeable tourism industry, and boasts a number of eco-tourist attractions. Xunhua Salar Autonomous County received approximately 4.36 million tourists in 2021, and earned 2.25 billion renminbi in tourist revenue.

Culture 
Lamian is a popular dish in the area, with the autonomous county's government boasting that the region has nearly 10,000 lamian shops.

Interethnic marriages 
Salar men from the area of present-day Xunhua Salar Autonomous County have had a long history of intermarriage with Tibetan women, conditional on the Tibetan women converting to Islam. Local Salar husbands have, in turn, incorporated Tibetan cultural practices they see as compatible with Islam into their lives, such as the placement of white stones on the outer walls of houses, and the consumption of Tibetan-style butter tea. As a result of the tangled ancestry of the two groups, and Salar respect for ethnic Tibetans, local Salars often call Tibetans "aiju", meaning "maternal uncle", a term with a respectful connotation.

Tibetan women were the original wives of the first Salars to arrive in the region as recorded in Salar oral history. The Tibetans agreed to let their Tibetan women marry Salar men after putting up several demands to accommodate cultural and religious differences. Hui and Salar intermarry due to cultural similarities and following the same Islamic religion. Older Salars married Tibetan women but younger Salars prefer marrying other Salars. Han and Salar mostly do not intermarry with each other unlike marriages of Tibetan women to Salar men. Salars however use Han surnames. Salar patrilineal clans are much more limited than Han patrilinial clans in how much they deal with culture, society or religion. Salar men often marry a lot of non-Salar women and they took Tibetan women as wives after migrating to Xunhua according to historical accounts and folk histories. Salars almost exclusively took non-Salar women as wives like Tibetan women while never giving Salar women to non-Salar men in marriage except for Hui men who were allowed to marry Salar women. As a result Salars are heavily mixed with other ethnicities.

Salars and Tibetans both use the term maternal uncle (ajiu in Salar and Chinese, azhang in Tibetan) to refer to each other, referring to the fact that Salars are descendants of Tibetan women marrying Salar men. After using these terms they often repeat the historical account how Tibetan women were married by 2,000 Salar men who were the First Salars to migrate to Qinghai. These terms illustrate that Salars were viewed separately from the Hui by Tibetans. According to legend, the marriages between Tibetan women and Salar men came after a compromise between demands by a Tibetan chief and the Salar migrants. The Salar say Wimdo valley was ruled by a Tibetan and he demanded the Salars follow 4 rules in order to marry Tibetan women. He asked them to install on their houses's four corners Tibetan Buddhist prayer flags, to pray with Tibetan Buddhist prayer wheels with the Buddhist mantra om mani padma hum and to bow before statues of Buddha. The Salars refused those demands saying they did not recite mantras or bow to statues since they believed in only one creator god and were Muslims. They compromised on the flags in houses by putting stones on their houses' corners instead of Tibetan Buddhist prayer flags. Some Tibetans do not differentiate between Salar and Hui due to their Islamic religion.

Today, a number of self-identifying Salars within the region claim to be descendants from Hui settlers who first moved from Hezhou during the early Ming dynasty, such as those in the villages of Majia and Chenjia.

See also
 Choekyi Gyaltsen, 10th Panchen Lama
 Han Youwen
 Jishi Bonan, Dongxiang and Salar Autonomous County
 List of administrative divisions of Qinghai
 Salar people
 Xunhua incident

References 

Autonomous counties of the People's Republic of China
County-level divisions of Qinghai
Haidong
Salar autonomous counties